Olympiastadion is a railway station in the Westend district of Berlin. The station consists of one island platform which is in regular use, as well as four further terminal island platforms which are only used for the extra trains during major events.

The station opened in 1909 on the Westbahn suburban railway north of the Grunewald forest. It was then called Rennbahn after a horse racing circuit at the site of the today's stadium. Like the nearby U-Bahn station it received the name Stadion in 1913, when the Deutsches Stadion, projected for the 1916 Summer Olympics, was inaugurated. After Berlin was awarded the 1936 Summer Olympics the station was again renamed Reichssportfeld until it got its actual designation in 1960, spelled without a hyphen in contrast to the Olympia-Stadion U-Bahn station. Adjacent to the south is the Berlin Unité d'Habitation, erected in 1958 according to plans by Le Corbusier. The station was closed in 1980, following the boycott by West Berliners on the East German-run S-Bahn, and the 1980 Deutsche Reichsbahn strike, taking away almost all traffic from the terminus. Most of the West Berlin portion of the S-Bahn, including Olympiastadion, was closed until 1998. The station re-opened in 1999.

References

External links
   Official station info
   Detailed history of the station

Olympiastadion
Olympiastadion
Railway stations in Germany opened in 1909